Lisbon Falls is a census-designated place (CDP) in the town of Lisbon, located in Androscoggin County, Maine, United States. The population of Lisbon Falls was 4,100 at the 2010 census. It is included in both the Lewiston-Auburn, Maine, metropolitan statistical area and the Lewiston-Auburn, Maine, Metropolitan New England city and town area.

History
Abenaki Indians called the falls Anmecangin, meaning "much fish". The area was once part of Little River Plantation, a portion of which was incorporated in 1799 as Thompsonborough, then renamed in 1802 after Lisbon, Portugal. In 1806, Lisbon annexed the remainder of Little River Plantation. With water power from the Androscoggin River, Lisbon Falls became a small mill town. Before it burned down in 1987, the Worumbo Mill was the main mill in Lisbon Falls. It had been incorporated in 1864, and was world-famous for its woolens. Especially well known were its vicuña wool products, which became famous when President Eisenhower's Chief of Staff, Sherman Adams, received a vicuna sport coat as a gift from a wealthy industrialist and had to resign due to the resulting scandal. The town's primary employment was at a gypsum mill, which closed in 2009. Another large employer is Bath Iron Works, in nearby Bath, Maine.

The town is famous for its Moxie Days, a celebration of the soft drink Moxie, which is sold at Frank Anicetti's corner store. The store's official name is the Kennebec Fruit Company, but it is commonly referred to as The Moxie Store and is recognizable by its bright yellow paint job. Moxie Days in Lisbon Falls is attended by thousands from around the world each summer.

Geography
Lisbon Falls is located at  (44.002177, -70.060102).

Lisbon Falls is drained by the Androscoggin River and the Little River.

Climate
This climatic region is typified by large seasonal temperature differences, with warm to hot (and often humid) summers and cold (sometimes severely cold) winters.  According to the Köppen Climate Classification system, Lisbon Falls has a humid continental climate, abbreviated "Dfb" on climate maps.

Demographics

As of the census of 2000, there were 4,420 people, 1,707 households, and 1,206 families residing in the CDP. The racial makeup of the CDP was 96.99% White, 0.63% African American, 0.23% Native American, 0.41% Asian, 0.07% Pacific Islander, 0.45% from other races, and 1.22% from two or more races. Hispanic or Latino of any race were 1.06% of the population.

There were 1,707 households, out of which 36.7% had children under the age of 18 living with them, 54.1% were married couples living together, 12.7% had a female householder with no husband present, and 29.3% were non-families. 22.6% of all households were made up of individuals, and 7.3% had someone living alone who was 65 years of age or older. The average household size was 2.59 and the average family size was 3.02.

In the CDP, the population was spread out, with 27.4% under the age of 18, 8.7% from 18 to 24, 32.6% from 25 to 44, 20.9% from 45 to 64, and 10.3% who were 65 years of age or older. The median age was 35 years. For every 100 females, there were 96.8 males. For every 100 females age 18 and over, there were 94.3 males.

The median income for a household in the CDP was $39,224, and the median income for a family was $42,476. Males had a median income of $31,735 versus $20,688 for females. The per capita income for the CDP was $16,838. About 8.5% of families and 10.2% of the population were below the poverty line, including 14.6% of those under age 18 and 4.6% of those age 65 or over.

Notable people
 John Gould, famous Maine humorist and author. He was the author of "Farmer Takes a Wife," "The Fastest Hound Dog in the State of Maine," and "Tales From Rhapsody Home, What They Don't Tell You About Senior Living." In his book On Writing, Stephen King recounts his experience working for John Gould at the Lisbon Enterprise, a weekly newspaper that Gould published.
 Stephen King, horror fiction writer, attended Lisbon Falls High School. The fictional town of Castle Rock, which he used in several stories, is thought to be based on Lisbon Falls. King utilized the town's actual name, description, and citizens in his 2011 novel, 11/22/63.

Site of interest
 Lisbon Historical Society Museum

References

External links
 Town of Lisbon, Maine
 Lisbon Falls Public Library
 Moxie Festival

Census-designated places in Maine
Census-designated places in Androscoggin County, Maine